Buffalo Township is a township in Kossuth County, Iowa, United States.

History
Buffalo Township was organized in 1884.

References

Townships in Kossuth County, Iowa
Townships in Iowa
1884 establishments in Iowa
Populated places established in 1884